Acrocercops hierocosma is a moth of the family Gracillariidae. It is known from the Northern Territory of Australia and India.

The larvae feed on Litchi chinensis. They probably mine the leaves of their host plant.

References

hierocosma
Moths of Asia
Moths of Australia
Moths described in 1912